St Gregory the Great Church is a Roman Catholic Parish church in Cheltenham, Gloucestershire, England. It was founded in 1809 and rebuilt from 1854 to 1857. It is situated on the corner of St James' Square and Clarence Street. It was designed by Charles Hansom and is a Grade II* listed building.

History

Foundation
In 1809, a chapel was built on the site of the present church. It was built with the guidance of its first priest, Fr Augustine Birdsall OSB from Douai Abbey.

Construction
In the spring of 1854, the monks from Douai Abbey were still serving the church when building work started on the church. The church was designed by Charles Hansom, brother of Joseph Hansom and father of Edward Joseph Hansom. He also designed Plymouth Cathedral and St Osburg's Church in Coventry. He designed it to be a Gothic Revival church.

In May 1857, the chancel was completed and the church was opened. That year, work on the tower and spire had started, but was of course not complete. In 1876, the tower and spire were completed. The next year, on 6 November 1877, the church was consecrated.

Inside of the church, the stained glass windows was designed by Hardman & Co. The altar and reredos were made by Farmer & Brindley. The majority of the carving was done by Messrs R. L. Boulton & Sons of Cheltenham; a firm who also worked on Cheltenham Town Hall, St John's Church in Poulton-le-Fylde, St Mary's Church and St Alban's Church in Warrington and St Cuthbert's in Earls Court.

Parish

The church is in the parish of St Gregory the Great with St Thomas More. It serves the St Thomas More Catholic Centre on Princess Elizabeth Way in Cheltenham. On 30 November 2011, St Thomas More Church was demolished and the church hall was developed to accommodate a sacristy, a chapel and use by community groups.

The church has four Sunday Masses:  8:00 am, 9:30 am, 11:15 am and 6:00 pm. St Thomas More Catholic Centre has one Sunday Mass at 5:00 pm on Saturday.

The church is currently undergoing a restoration to the roof and the walls . Also replacing the lighting inside the church. This should be finished by the end of November 2018. See the parish website for a weekly blog of how the work is going.

See also
 Cheltenham Deanery
 Roman Catholic Diocese of Clifton

References

External links

 St Gregory the Great with St Thomas More Parish site
 St Thomas More Catholic Centre site

Roman Catholic churches in Gloucestershire
Saint Gregory
Grade II* listed churches in Gloucestershire
Grade II* listed Roman Catholic churches in England
Gothic Revival church buildings in England
Gothic Revival architecture in Gloucestershire
Roman Catholic churches completed in 1876
1809 establishments in England
19th-century Roman Catholic church buildings in the United Kingdom